Jeanine Delpech (born Jeanine Louise Nelly Delpech; 1 August 1905 – 3 July 1992) was a French journalist and translator from English, as well as an author of romance novels, detective novels, sentimental novels, and historical works. Her works appeared under various names including Jean de Lutry, Robert Beauchamp, Jeanine Goldet, Jeanine Antoine-Goldet, Louise Nelly Delpech-Teissier and Madame Robert Teissier. Delpech died in 1992.

Early life and education
Jeanine Louise Nelly Delpech was born in 1905 at the Château du Prieuré in Évecquemont, to Edmond Jean Frédéric Marie Delpech, a lawyer, and Françoise Marie Reine Suzanne Estier, his wife.

In 1935, she received a Bachelor of Arts degree in literature from the Faculty of Paris.

Career
She began her literary career by publishing numerous historical works, including several on criminal cases or famous criminals. She also provided a few romance novels to various publishers, including Groupe Flammarion, sometimes using the pseudonym, "Jean de Lutry". She collaborated for many years with the literary and artistic journal, Les Nouvelles littéraires, as well as with other cultural publications. Under the pseudonym of "Robert Beauchamp", she published half a dozen detective novels in the 1960s by the Presses de la Cité and, in the 1970s, in the Le Masque collection. As a translator, she was the author of the French language texts of the novel, Eh bien, ma jolie, by James Hadley Chase, Les Lévriers du seraglio by Mary Stewart, and the biographical account of Ernest Hemingway entitled, Les Vertes Collines d'Afrique. In addition to using various masculine pen names, including "Jean de Lutry" and "Robert Beauchamp" After her marriage to Antoine Goldet, she signed some of her texts "Jeanine Goldet" or "Jeanine Antoine-Goldet". Having married Robert Tessier11, she signed her works, "Louise Nelly Delpech-Teissie" or "Madame Robert Teissier".

Personal life
In 1925, she became engaged to Antoine Goldet, then a student at the École Normale Supérieure. Their daughter, Nicole, was born the following year, and their son, François, in 1929. After a divorce, Jeanine remarried in 1937 with Robert Tessier.

She died 3 July 1992, in the 7th arrondissement of Paris.

Awards
 1958, Prix Alice-Louis-Barthou, from the Académie Française, for L’Âme de la Fronde : Madame de Longueville (1957)

Selected works

Novels

Romance novels
 Les Noces de minuit, 1955
 Le Serpent d’émeraude, 1957

Romance novels by Jean de Lutry 
 Cendrillon à Hollywood, 1951
 Les Fiancés de Venise, 1957
 La Violette et l’Orchidée, 1958

Detective novels by Robert Beauchamp  
 Flagrant Délire, 1961
 Les Nymphes d’Auteuil, 1962
 Six x = zéro, 1971
 L’Héritière malgré elle, 1971
 Des nuits trop blanches, 1973

Historical novels 
 Isaline, 1971

Other novels 
 Les Liens de fumée, 1947 
 Une nuit pour le diable, 1960

Historical works 
 La Double Mary, reine des voleurs au temps de Shakespeare, 1943
 Louise de Kéroualle, 1949 
 L’Âme de la Fronde : Madame de Longueville, 1957
 L’Amour le plus tendre : Le Chevalier de Boufflers et Mme de Sabran, 1964
 La Passion de la Marquise de Sade, 1970 
 Gentleman jusqu’au crime, 1972 
 La Demoiselle à l’arsenic, 1973

Translations from English to French
 Eh bien, ma jolie, by James Hadley Chase
 Les Lévriers du seraglio, by Mary Stewart
 Les Vertes Collines d'Afrique,biographical account of Ernest Hemingway

References

External links
 Jeanine Delpech's interview with Albert Camus, first published in Les Nouvelles litteraires, 15 November, 1945, included in Camus' Lyrical and Critical Essays.

1905 births
1992 deaths
People from Yvelines
20th-century French novelists
French romantic fiction writers
Crime novelists
French historical novelists
20th-century French historians
20th-century pseudonymous writers
Pseudonymous women writers